Simon Greul and Bastian Knittel were the defending champions but decided not to participate.

Seeds

Draw

Draw

References
 Main Draw

Kosice Open - Doubles
2012 Doubles